Nebrarctia is a genus of moths in the family Erebidae from the Near East, Central Asia and Himalayas. The genus was erected by Otto Staudinger in 1891.

Species
 Nebrarctia guttata (Erschoff, 1874)
 Nebrarctia hunza (de Freina, 1997)
 Nebrarctia semiramis (Staudinger, 1891 [1892])
 Nebrarctia semiramis elbursi (Daniel, 1937)
 Nebrarctia transversa (Moore, 1879)
 Nebrarctia transversa puella (Staudinger, 1887)
 Nebrarctia transversa vartianae (Daniel, 1965)
 Nebrarctia wiltshirei (Toulgoët, 1962)

References
 , 2010: Tiger-moths of Eurasia (Lepidoptera, Arctiidae) (Nyctemerini by ). Neue Entomologische Nachrichten 65 1–106, Marktleuthen.

Spilosomina
Moth genera